The Thayer Hotel is a 151-room "Historic Hotel of America" property located 50 miles north of New York City on the banks of the Hudson River at 674 Thayer Road in West Point, New York on the campus of the United States Military Academy. It is named after Sylvanus Thayer, West Point class of 1808, the "father of the Military Academy." It replaced the West Point Hotel in 1926.

The Thayer Hotel has three main markets: tourists visiting West Point, weddings, and corporate conferences.  The Thayer Hotel came under new management in October 2009. The 151-room hotel has been completely renovated, re-branded, and is now being marketed to host corporate events and leadership training. Renovations completed at The Thayer Hotel in 2012, have brought about the opening of its new executive suite wing, which includes 23 suite-style rooms.

History

In 1829, the West Point Hotel was built near the Plain on Trophy Point. The West Point Hotel served the academy for over a century, hosting a long list of dignitaries such as Robert E. Lee, Ulysses S. Grant, Stonewall Jackson, Winfield Scott, William Tecumseh Sherman, Washington Irving, Edgar Allan Poe, and James Whistler. Perhaps that hotel's history is tied most famously to one of West Point's most famous graduates, General Douglas MacArthur. During General Douglas MacArthur's time as a cadet, his mother lived in the West Point Hotel. When Brigadier General Douglas MacArthur returned from World War I to become the Superintendent of West Point, he started a major expansion program of the buildings. The new Thayer Hotel was one of these expansion projects and the Thayer Hotel officially opened May 27, 1926 with 225 rooms. General MacArthur would return to West Point and stay in the hotel in 1962 for one final time to give his noted "Duty, Honor, Country" speech to the cadets as he received the Thayer Award.

The former Iran hostages were housed at the hotel immediately upon their return to the United States. The former hostages spent the night at the hotel and signed a menu which is still on display in the lobby, as well as a brass plaque given by the former hostages to the Thayer Hotel thanking the hotel for welcoming them home.

The 151 room Thayer Hotel has undergone several renovations over the years – most recently in 2012, with the opening of the 23-room executive suite wing. The main conference rooms and public spaces are all named after prominent Americans who were instrumental in West Point's history. The hotel has named the "President George Washington Ballroom" (who first headquartered at West Point in 1779); President Thomas Jefferson Patio (founded the US Military Academy in 1802); President Ulysses S. Grant Room (class of 1843); President Dwight D. Eisenhower Room (class of 1915); General Douglas MacArthur Room (class of 1903); General of the Armies John J. Pershing Room (class of 1886 who led ally armies in WWI); General Omar Bradley Room (class of 1915); and General George S. Patton Tavern (class of 1909).

References

External links
Official Site

1926 establishments in New York (state)
Buildings and structures in Orange County, New York
Highland Falls, New York
Hotel buildings completed in 1926
Hotels established in 1926
Hotels in New York (state)
United States Military Academy